Kym Purling is an Australian pianist, entertainer, composer, conductor, producer, educator, world traveller and humanitarian. He was born in Vietnam, adopted and raised in Australia and lives in New York City.

Life and career
Kym Purling was found abandoned at the age of two or three days to unknown parents during the Vietnam War. After spending the first months of his life in two orphanages in Saigon (now Ho Chi Minh City), he soon became one of the first - if not the first - international adoptions of any nationality in Australia.

Purling discovered the piano at the age of five when he would mimic the songs his adoptive sister would practice by ear. He commenced formal classical piano training at the age of six and continued to teach himself many other styles of music during his schooling years. He received his high school education at Westminster School, one of the best private schools in Adelaide, South Australia. He later completed a Bachelor of Music in Jazz Studies at the University of Adelaide, South Australia, where he formed the first Kym Purling Trio with bassist Tim Bowen and drummer Ben Riley. The trio received wide recognition all around Australia and also served as the rhythm section for many of Australia's leading jazz musicians and vocalists. During this time, still in his early twenties, Purling made over 250 performances a year and also performed in the corporate and government sectors. A highlight during this period was performing for the Dalai Lama. During the mid 90s, he also recorded his first albums, Trio Juice, Catherine Lambert & The Kym Purling Trio, and Let's Swing!

In 1996, Purling served as an Ambassador for the Performing Arts between Australia and Vietnam. This was Purling's first return to his homeland since his adoption to Australia. During Purling's ambassadorship, he held sold-out concerts in concerts halls around Ho Chi Minh City and Hanoi, introducing jazz music to the Vietnamese people. During the residency, Purling also taught many children, students and professional musicians and made recordings for educational purposes. He featured in many newspaper articles and radio interviews during the time he spent in Vietnam. Vietnam's major TV network, VTV, also produced a special about Purling's life story and his connection to Vietnam. His work in Vietnam crossed many cultural and language barriers, proving that music is the universal language. Purling did not know anyone or know any of the Vietnamese language before arriving there.

At the conclusion of the ambassadorship, Purling briefly returned to his performances in Australia and also had two television documentaries made about his life story and career for Australian national  television in 1998 and 1999. Soon after, Purling moved to the United States where he resided and worked in Las Vegas for two and a half years. During this time, Purling  performed in many of the showrooms along the famed Las Vegas Strip, playing and musical directing for some of the biggest names in show business such as Kay Starr, Buddy Greco, The Mills Brothers, Marlena Shaw, David Cassidy, Clint Holmes and Frank Sinatra Jr.

Purling was then recommended to a Broadway theatrical company based in Times Square (Big League Theatricals, now Big League Productions), and began musical directing and conducting Broadway shows and national tours of hit Broadway musicals such as Footloose- The Musical, Miss Saigon and 42nd Street. Purling traveled 50 states of the U.S. conducting shows in small towns and large metropolises right across America, Canada and Japan.

Purling later relocated to Florida and formed another Kym Purling Trio with bassist Alejandro Arenas and drummer Mark Feinman. The trio worked often, giving many concerts around Florida. While in Florida, Purling formed the Kym Purling Jazz Orchestra (KPJO), one of the finest big bands on the U.S. east coast. During the next four years, Purling also worked regularly for HSN-TV, a national television network, making regular television performances and recording a U.S. national television show with vocal legend, Natalie Cole. 

Purling was later appointed as musical director, conductor and pianist for vocal legend, Engelbert Humperdinck. With Humperdinck and his band, Purling spent he next two years conducting and performing across America and around the world, in many of the world's most prestigious concert halls and many of the largest outdoor arenas around the world.

The following months saw a move to Los Angeles where Purling resided for a short time. Purling performed regularly at the Montage Hotel in Beverly Hills and regularly recorded television commercials while in Los Angeles. 

Purling's love for worldwide travel then led him to start making appearances as a headline fly-on entertainer on luxury high-end cruise lines all over the world which he continues to do today. Traveling with guest status on the world's best cruise liners, Purling performs one or two shows during the week on board with a seven piece backing band, entertaining the cruise guests in theaters with capacities of 1250 and beyond.

Purling is also an active humanitarian and performs concerts worldwide to support his various humanitarian projects, primarily assisting orphans and children in Vietnam, Nepal and other developing countries. In May 2015 in St. Petersburg, Florida, he raised money for the victims of the earthquakes in Nepal.

Awards

References

External links

1972 births
Living people
Australian jazz pianists
Musicians from Las Vegas
People from Ho Chi Minh City
People from Adelaide
Vietnamese musicians
Musicians of Vietnamese descent
People educated at Westminster School, Adelaide
21st-century pianists